Kātouzian in Zoroastrianism refers to the priests at the time of Jamshid who conducted the worship of Hormozd. They used to dwell in mountains and caves, praying and looking for wisdom.
The word Kātouzian itself is a plural form of the word Kātouzi.

According to Shahnameh, Jamshid had divided the people into four groups:
 Kātouzians
 Neysārians: The warriors who protected the people by the might of their arms
 Nāsoudians: The farmers who grew the grain that fed the people
 Hotokhoshians: The artisans, who produced goods for the ease and enjoyment of the people

In Shahnameh, Ferdowsi says:

See also
 Magi

References

Shahnameh characters
 
Persian mythology